Laureano Brizuela (born July 22, 1949) is an Argentine singer-songwriter and musician whose career has spanned over 30 years.

Early life 

Brizuela is the grandson of painter Laureano Brizuela Giménez (1891-1951). His mother, a Bolivian biochemist, later earned Argentine citizenship through her husband.

Career 
At first studying musicology, he later abandoned it in favor of pursuing a singing career. In 1972, when he was 22 years old, he released his first single.

He has produced a string of successful covers, including the Spanish version of Roy Orbison's classic 1956 song "Pretty Woman" into Muchachita.

Albums 

 Por qué te quiero tanto
 Laureano
 El americano
 El Ángel del Rock (seudónimo que Brizuela adoptó en México).
 Solo
 Viento del sur
 Lo más fuerte del Ángel del Rock
 4 - Griten
 Viajero del tiempo
 Alborada
 Vivir una vez
 Huellas
 Estaciones
 Si quieres amarme
 20 secretos de amor

References 

Living people
1949 births
20th-century Argentine male singers
Argentine people of Irish descent
Argentine male singer-songwriters